Marie-Louise Pichot (1885–1947) was a French Impressionist painter.

Biography 
Marie-Louise Pichot was a well-known artist from the Montmartre district. She was inspired by the work of the impressionists, and focuses mainly through her works on representations of the female body, nude or still life painting.

In February 1937, she took part in the collective exhibition “Les femmes artistes d'Europe exposent au Jeu de Paume” organized at the Jeu de Paume, honoring the works of contemporary women artists across Europe.

References 

1885 births
1947 deaths
French women painters
French contemporary artists
20th-century French painters
Painters from Paris
20th-century French women artists